Richard Vergette is a British playwright, actor and drama teacher. In 2013 his American Justice, an American congressman's encounter with his daughter's killer, was shown at London's Arts Theatre.  His 2015 Dancing Through the Shadows was performed by Hull Truck Theatre as part of a trilogy about the history of Hull, and his PURE, about the chocolate industry, will form part of Mikron Theatre Company's 2016 tour.   

He has been Head of the Faculty of Performing Arts at John Leggott College, Scunthorpe and a lecturer at the University of Lincoln, written textbooks for school drama students, and acted in the 2010 short film The Legend of Beggar's Bridge.   And has recently retired from his role as Director of Drama and Head of Learning and Teaching at Ackworth School, a Quaker school in West Yorkshire.

Plays
Date and place of first production as shown in doollee.com
An Englishman's Home (2007, 24:7 Theatre Festival, Manchester)
Ring Around the Humber (2011, Hull Truck Theatre)
Nice (2011, Salford Studio Theatre)
American Justice (2013, Arts Theatre, London), based on his 2009 work As We Forgive Them
Dancing Through the Shadows (2015, Hull Truck Theatre)
PURE (2016, Mikron Theatre Company)

Publications
Drama & Theatre Studies: AQA Advanced (2008, Philip Allen)
Edexcel advanced drama and theatre studies textbook (2008, Philip Allen)

References

External links
 Details of Vergette's plays 

Year of birth missing (living people)
Living people
English dramatists and playwrights